Sanders Farm is a historic home and farm located at Max Meadows, Wythe County, Virginia. The Brick House was built about 1880, and is a two-story, "T"-shaped, Queen Anne style brick farmhouse. It features ornamental gables and porches. Also on the property are the contributing cold frame with a stepped front parapet (c. 1900), a vaulted stone spring house, a one-story brick servants quarters (c. 1880), a cinder block store with an upstairs apartment and an accompanying privy (1950s), a frame vehicle repair shop (c. 1920s), a stone reservoir (1880s) two corn crib, a frame gambrel-roofed barn, a one-story tenant house (c. 1920), stone bridge abutments, and the site of the Hematite Iron Company Mine (late 1880s), a complex of rock formations and tram line beds.

It was listed on the National Register of Historic Places in 2003.

References

Houses on the National Register of Historic Places in Virginia
Farms on the National Register of Historic Places in Virginia
Federal architecture in Virginia
Queen Anne architecture in Virginia
Houses completed in 1880
Houses in Wythe County, Virginia
National Register of Historic Places in Wythe County, Virginia